The Bugline Trail is a paved  rail trail located on the former Chicago, Milwaukee, St. Paul and Pacific Railroad (Milwaukee Road) right-of-way in Waukesha County, Wisconsin.

The trail stretches between Appleton Avenue (Highway 175) in Menomonee Falls to just east of North Lake in Merton. A separate 4-foot wide bridle trail adjacent to the original 8-foot wide recreation trail extends  from The Ranch in Menomonee Falls to Menomonee Park where it joins the park bridle trails.

References 

Rail trails in Wisconsin
Tourist attractions in Waukesha County, Wisconsin